Mesalia brevialis is a species of sea snail, a marine gastropod mollusk in the family Turritellidae.

Description

Distribution

References

 Gofas, S.; Le Renard, J.; Bouchet, P. (2001). Mollusca. in: Costello, M.J. et al. (eds), European Register of Marine Species: a check-list of the marine species in Europe and a bibliography of guides to their identification. Patrimoines Naturels. 50: 180–213.

External links
 Lamarck [J.-B. M. de. (1822). Histoire naturelle des animaux sans vertèbres. Tome septième. Paris: published by the Author, 711 pp]
 Reeve, L.A. (1849). Monograph of the genus Turritella. In: Conchologia Iconica. vol. 5, pl. 1-11 and unpaginated text. L. Reeve & Co., London.

Turritellidae
Gastropods described in 1822